The House of Khilkoff or Khilkov is a Rurikid princely family descending from sovereign rulers of Starodub-on-the-Klyazma. The descendant of the Great Prince Vladimir Svyatoslavich, the Christianizer of Russia, Prince Ivan Vsevolodovich,(c. 958 – 15 July 1015) received from his brother, the Great Prince Yaroslav Vsevolodovich, the appanage of Starodub, and this originated the Princes of Starodub; those who later had the Ryapolovskaya volost took the name Prince Ryapolovsky in the sixteenth century, for an unknown reason, the Ryapolovskys changed their name: the older branch to Khilkoff, and the younger to Tatev.

The founder of the Khilkoffs was the great-grandson of Prince Ivan Andreyevich Ryapolovsky (Nagavitsa), Prince Ivan Fyodorovich Khilok. The Khilkoffs have played a notable part in Russian history. Under Tsar Alexey Mikhailovich there were 16 noble families whose members rose straight to the rank of boyar, missing out that of okolnichiy; the Princes Khilkoff were among that number. At the time of the 1917 revolution the Khilkoff family were the 14th wealthiest family in Russia, fleeing Russia to stay with the King of Denmark, then dispersing over Europe. Khilkoff descendants today live in France, Belgium, United Kingdom, The United States of America, Switzerland, Canada, Australia, and Moscow - the city they founded in 1147.

Notable figures
 Prince Andrey Khilkov (1676—1718)
 Prince Stepan Khilkov (1786—1854)
 Prince Mikhail Khilkov (1834—1909)
 Prince Dmitry Khilkov (1858—1915)

References 

Russian noble families